The 1980 U.S. Open was the 80th U.S. Open, held June 12–15 at Baltusrol Golf Club in Springfield, New Jersey, west of New York City. Jack Nicklaus set a new tournament scoring record to win his fourth U.S. Open title, two strokes ahead of runner-up Isao Aoki; in fact, as the tournament transpired these two golfers ended up playing all four rounds together.

Nicklaus and Tom Weiskopf began the tournament by shooting a record-tying 63 in the first round on the Lower Course on Thursday. Weiskopf, however, did not shoot better than 75 in any other round and finished 37th. After a second round 71, Nicklaus owned a two-stroke lead over Isao Aoki. Aoki, however, carded a third consecutive round of 68 in the third to tie Nicklaus.

In the final round on Sunday, Nicklaus birdied the 3rd after Aoki recorded a bogey on 2, taking a two-shot lead. Nicklaus, however, could not separate himself from his challenger. After he hit his approach to 3 feet on 10, Aoki made a long putt from the fringe for a birdie. On the 17th Nicklaus holed a 22-footer for birdie while Aoki made his own 5-footer for birdie. And at the 18th Nicklaus rolled in another birdie from 10-feet to win the championship, his sixteenth major title as a professional.

Nicklaus' winning total of 272 established a new U.S. Open standard, breaking the record 275 he set in 1967 on the same Lower Course. He also tied Willie Anderson, Bobby Jones, and Ben Hogan by winning his fourth U.S. Open title. Nicklaus had failed to win a tournament in 1979 for the first time in his career, and at 40 many believed his best days were behind him. He won four more times on the PGA Tour with two majors, including the PGA Championship two months later and the Masters in 1986.

Seve Ballesteros, the reigning champion of the British Open and Masters, was late to the course on Friday, missed his tee time, and was disqualified; he had carded a 75 on Thursday.

The U.S. Open returned to the Lower Course in 1993, and the PGA Championship was played there in 2005 and in 2016.

Course layout

Lower Course

Source:

Lengths of the course for previous major championships:

, par 70 - 1967 U.S. Open
, par 70 - 1954 U.S. Open
, par 72 - 1936 U.S. Open (Upper Course)

, par 74 - 1915 U.S. Open (Old Course)
, par      - 1903 U.S. Open (Old Course)The Old Course was plowed under in 1918

Past champions in the field

Made the cut

Missed the cut 

Source:

Round summaries

First round
Thursday, June 12, 1980

Second round
Friday, June 13, 1980

Source:

Amateurs: Hallberg (+2), Clampett (+6), Sigel (+7), Sindelar (+7), Wagner (+9), Wood (+10), Blake (+11), Sutton (+11), Rassett (+13), Sluman (+15), Clearwater (+16), Mudd (+16), Norton (+16), O'Meara (+16), Bergin (+17), Landers (+20), Chalas (+21), Glickley (+22).

Third round
Saturday, June 14, 1980

Source:

Final round
Sunday, June 15, 1980

Source:

Amateurs: Gary Hallberg (+5), Bobby Clampett (+10).

Scorecard
Final round

Cumulative tournament scores, relative to par

Source:

References

External links
GolfCompendium.com – 1980 U.S. Open
USOpen.com – 1980

U.S. Open (golf)
Golf in New Jersey
Springfield Township, Union County, New Jersey
U.S. Open
U.S. Open (golf)
U.S. Open (golf)